Mansion Builder, released in 1978, is the third studio album from contemporary Christian music group 2nd Chapter of Acts, their first for the recently created Sparrow Records. Members of 2nd Chapter of Acts' touring band, a band called David, also perform on this album.

Track listing

Source:

Personnel
Gene Gunnels – drums
Peter York – guitar
Herb Melton – bass
Richard Souther – piano, keyboards, clavinet, organ, mini-moog
Annie Herring – piano
Bill Maxwell – drums
Abraham Laboriel – bass
Jay Graydon – guitar
Michael Omartian – arpvaak, piano, percussion
Buck Herring – producer, engineer
Source:

References

1978 albums
2nd Chapter of Acts albums